Poems of Passion is a collection of poems by Ella Wheeler Wilcox that was published in 1883.

Despite the fact that the book's title "threatened to spark a scandal," eventually it "was embraced by thousands of perfectly respectable midwestern readers."

Contents

Poems of Passion contains the following poems:

 Love's Language
 Impatience
 Communism
 The Common Lot
 Individuality
 Friendship After Love
 Queries
 Upon the Sand
 Reunited
 What shall we do?
 "The beautiful blue Danube"
 Answered
 Through the valley
 But One
 Guilo
 The Duet
 Little Queen
 Wherefore?
 Delilah
 Love Song
 Time and Love
 Change
 Desolation
 Isaura
 The coquette
 New and old
 quite the same
 From the grave
 A Waltz-Quadrille
 Beppo
 Tired
 The speech of silence
 Conversion
 Love's coming
 Old and new
 Perfectness
 Attraction
 Gracia
 Ad finem
 Bleak Weather
 An answer
 You will forget me
 The farewell of Clarimonde
 The Trio

Miscellaneous poems:

 The Lost Garden
 Art and Heart
 Mockery
 As by fire
 If I should die
 Misalliance
 Response
 Drought
 The Creed
 Progress
 My friend
 Creation
 Red carnations
 Life is too short
 A sculptor
 Beyond
 The saddest hour
 Show me the way
 My heritage
 Resolve
 At Eleusis
 Courage
 Solitude
 The year outgrows the spring
 The beautiful land of nod
 The tiger
 Only a simple rhyme
 I will be worthy of it
 Sonnet
 Regret
 Let me lean hard
 Penalty
 Sunset
 The wheel of my breast
 A meeting
 Earnestness
 A picture
 Twin-born
 Floods
 A fable

References 

 Poems of Passion. The Boston Daily Globe. 24 Jun. 1883: 13.
 Wilcox, Ella Wheeler, "Poems of Passion". Project Gutenberg. Retrieved 9 January 2019.

1883 books
American poetry collections